Philodoria pipturiana is a moth of the family Gracillariidae. It was first described by Otto Herman Swezey in 1923. It is endemic to the island of Hawaii.

The larvae feed on Pipturus species. They probably mine the leaves of their host plant.

External links

Philodoria
Endemic moths of Hawaii